Rafiq Uddin Ahmed (30 October 1926 – 21 February 1952) was a protester killed during the Bengali Language Movement that took place in East Pakistan (currently Bangladesh) in 1952. He is considered a martyr in Bangladesh.

Early life
Ahmed was born October 30, 1926 in Paril village (renamed 'Rafiqnagar'), Singair, Manikganj District, East Bengal, British Raj. His father's name was Abdul Latif and mother's name was Rafiza Khatun. Rafiq was the eldest son of the couple's five sons and two daughters. Rafiq's grandfather is Mohammad Makhim.  He passed his matriculation from Baira School in 1949. He studied Intermediate level from Debendra College but dropped out before finishing. He moved to Dhaka and started working in a printing press owned by his father. In Dhaka, he was admitted to the Department of Accounting Science at the then Jagannath College.

Bengali Language Movement 
Ahmed was active in the student protest demanding Bengali be made the national language of Pakistan on 21 February 1952 despite Section 144(curfew) at Dhaka University. When police opened fire at the demonstration in front of Dhaka Medical College premises, Rafiq was shot in the head and died immediately. His body was found on the east side of Room 5 of the medical hostel. Six to seven agitators found his body on the porch behind the Anatomy Hall. He was buried at Azimpur Graveyard under guard of Pakistan Army. His grave, though, was lost and could not be identified later.

Legacy
He was awarded Ekushey Padak posthumously in the year 2000 for his sacrifice. His village has been renamed Rafiqnagar from Paril and Bhasha Shaheed Rafiq Uddin Ahmad Library and Memorial Museum was created in his village in February 2010. The museum in memoriam of Rafiq was erected as a testament to the patriotism and courage he displayed being a martyr of the movement. The museum is quite empty and does not house many significant artifacts, or memorabilia. Shaheed Rafiq Smriti Pathagar is a library in Manikganj named after him and was established in 2004. "Chander Moto Chandro Bindu" is a play based on his memoirs.

References

External links
 Short biography in Prime Minister's official website, Govt. Of Bangladesh

1926 births
1952 deaths
1952 murders in Pakistan
Bengali language movement activists
Deaths by firearm in Bangladesh
People murdered in Bangladesh
Recipients of the Ekushey Padak
Burials at Azimpur Graveyard